Tekchand Shrawan Sawarkar is an Indian politician who won the 14th Maharashtra Legislative Assembly election. He represents Kamthi (Vidhan Sabha constituency). He was elected in 2019 Maharashtra Legislative Assembly election. Sawarkar is from the Bharatiya Janata Party.

References

Living people
Members of the Maharashtra Legislative Assembly
Marathi politicians
Year of birth missing (living people)
Bharatiya Janata Party politicians from Maharashtra